The 1996 EA-Generali Ladies Linz was a women's tennis tournament played on indoor carpet courts at the Intersport Arena in Linz in Austria that was part of Tier III of the 1996 WTA Tour. It was the tenth edition of the tournament and was held from 26 February until 3 March 1996. Sixth-seeded Sabine Appelmans won the singles title.

Finals

Singles

 Sabine Appelmans defeated  Julie Halard-Decugis 6–2, 6–4
 It was Appelmans' only title of the year and the 8th of her career.

Doubles

 Manon Bollegraf /  Meredith McGrath defeated  Rennae Stubbs /  Helena Suková 6–4, 6–4
 It was Bollegraf's 1st title of the year and the 22nd of her career. It was McGrath's 2nd title of the year and the 26th of her career.

References

External links
 ITF tournament edition details

EA-Generali Ladies Linz
Linz Open
EA-Generali Ladies Linz
EA-Generali Ladies Linz
EA-Generali Ladies Linz
Generali